Kajsa Louise Reingardt (born 22 June 1957, Malmö, Sweden) is a Swedish actress.

Reingardt studied at Malmö Theatre Academy 1977–80 and worked after the education at Malmö City Theatre but also at Borås City Theatre. Since 1992 she works at Stockholm City Theatre.

Selected filmography
2008 - Oskyldigt dömd (TV)
2007–2010 - Hotell Kantarell (TV)
2006–present - Häxan Surtant (TV)
2005 - Van Veeteren – Carambole
1998 - Beck – Öga för öga
1989 - Fallgropen
1986 - Skånska mord (TV)
1979 - Våning för 4 (TV)

References

External links

Kajsa Reingardt on Swedish Film Database

Swedish actresses
People from Malmö
Living people
1957 births